Khassafiat (also Romanized as Khaşşāfīāt and Khaşşā Feyāt; also known as Khashāfīāt and Shāhzādeh Ḩamzeh) is a village in Soviren Rural District, Cham Khalaf-e Isa District, Hendijan County, Khuzestan Province, Iran. At the 2006 census, its population was 18, in 4 families.

References 

Populated places in Hendijan County